Paolo Butigella (1475 – October 9, 1531) was the Master of the Order of Preachers from 1530 to 1531.

Biography

Paolo Butigella was a native of Padua. He joined the Dominican Order in 1494 at the monastery of Santa Maria degli Angeli in Ferrara. He served as vicar general of the Congregation of Lombardy 1516-18 and again 1522–24. From 1520 to 1522, he was prior at the monastery of San Domenico in Bologna. He participated in the order's general chapters in Mantua in 1516 and in Forlì in 1522. The general chapter held in Rome in 1530 elected him Master of the Order of Preachers. He served only a year, dying in Naples on October 9, 1531.

References
Michael Tavuzzi, Renaissance Inquisitors. Dominican Inquisitors and Inquisitorial Districts in Northern Italy, 1474-1527, Brill: Leiden - Boston 2007, p. 243

1475 births
1531 deaths
Italian Dominicans
Masters of the Order of Preachers